Hamburger is a German surname, meaning "someone from Hamburg". Notable people with the surname include:

 Adolphe Hamburger, Dutch actor
 Bo Hamburger, Danish cyclist
 Cao Hamburger, Brazilian screenwriter and director
 E. W. Hamburger (1933–2018), Brazilian-German physicist, and father of Cao Hamburger
 Hans Hamburger (1889–1956), German mathematician
 Jeffrey F. Hamburger, art historian
 Jean Hamburger, French physician
 Jenő Hamburger, Hungarian communist politician
 Käte Hamburger, German writer and philosopher
 Michael Hamburger, British writer and poet
 Michel Berger (born Michel Jean Hamburger, 1947-1992), French singer, son of Jean Hamburger
 Neil Hamburger, comedian
 Raphael Hamburger, French producer and soundtrack music supervisor.
 Samuel B. Hamburger (1852–1926), American lawyer
 Viktor Hamburger, German professor and embryologist

German-language surnames